The 2012 Detroit Tigers season was the team's 112th season. On October 1, the Tigers clinched the AL Central title, the club's first repeat title since 1934–1935. They finished the regular season 88–74. They defeated the Oakland Athletics in the American League Divisional Series, 3 games to 2. It was the Tigers' second consecutive ALDS win. The Tigers went on to sweep the New York Yankees in the American League Championship Series before being swept themselves by the San Francisco Giants in the World Series.

Roster moves

Releases

On October 29, the Tigers released relief pitcher Joel Zumaya to free agency.
On November 1, the Tigers released outfielder Magglio Ordóñez, infielder Carlos Guillén, and starting pitcher Brad Penny to free agency.
On December 12, the Tigers released utility infielder Will Rhymes to free agency.
On March 12, the Tigers released relief pitcher David Pauley. On March 15, Pauley cleared waivers and became a free agent.
On April 26, the Tigers released veteran infielder Brandon Inge after 12 seasons.

Key injuries
On December 16, the team announced that relief pitcher Al Alburquerque had surgery on his pitching elbow, to replace a stress fracture.
On January 17, it was reported that designated hitter/catcher/infielder Víctor Martínez tore his ACL and needs surgery to repair it. On March 12, the team placed Martinez on the 60-day disabled list and declared him out for the season.

Signings and key returns

On October 28, the Tigers picked up the option on closer José Valverde.
On November 18, the Tigers signed catcher Gerald Laird to a one-year contract. Laird had been the Tigers' primary catcher for the 2009 and 2010 seasons.
Also on November 18, the club purchased the minor league contracts of pitching prospects Casey Crosby, Tyler Stohr and Matt Hoffman; outfielder Avisaíl García and infielder Hernan Perez.
On November 30, the Tigers re-signed second baseman Ramón Santiago to a two-year deal.
On December 9, the Tigers announced a one-year deal with relief pitcher Octavio Dotel.  There is an option for the 2013 season.
On January 16, the Tigers avoided arbitration with starting pitcher Rick Porcello and reliever Phil Coke, signing both to one-year deals.  The following day, the team agreed on one-year deals for starting pitcher Max Scherzer, outfielder Delmon Young and utilityman Don Kelly.  This helps the team avoid an arbitration hearing for the 10th year in a row.
On January 24, the Tigers signed first baseman Prince Fielder to a nine-year, $214 million deal. As a result, Miguel Cabrera moved to third base.
On April 20, the Tigers re-acquired pitcher Zach Miner from the Kansas City Royals in exchange for cash. Miner will report to the AA Erie SeaWolves.

Trades

On December 9, the Tigers traded relief pitcher Ryan Perry to the Washington Nationals for fellow reliever Collin Balester.
On July 23, the Tigers traded pitcher Jacob Turner and two minor league prospects (catcher Rob Brantly and pitcher Brian Flynn) to the Miami Marlins for starting pitcher Aníbal Sánchez and infielder Omar Infante.
On August 6, the Tigers acquired utilityman Jeff Baker from the Chicago Cubs for two minor league players to be named later. He was traded to the Atlanta Braves on August 31 for a player to be named later.

Delmon Young's arrest
On April 27, 2012, an intoxicated Delmon Young was arrested for third-degree assault and an "aggravated harassment hate crime" in New York City after a confrontation with a group of Jewish tourists in which he made antisemitic remarks outside of their hotel before a series against the Yankees. Later in the day, Young issued a statement apologizing for his actions. On April 30, Young was suspended without pay for seven games, and ordered to undergo therapy.

Individual accomplishments
On September 27, starting pitcher Doug Fister struck out 9 batters in a row, a new American League record. It was just one short of the Major League record of 10 in a row, accomplished by Tom Seaver in 1970.
With a .330 average, 44 home runs and 139 RBIs, slugger Miguel Cabrera became the first player in 45 years to win the Triple Crown, leading the American League in all three categories. The last player to accomplish this feat was Carl Yastrzemski in 1967. He went on to win the 2012 AL Most Valuable Player Award. He also won this year's AL Hank Aaron Award, and the AL Silver Slugger Award. 
Starters Justin Verlander and Max Scherzer finished first and second among the American League strikeout leaders, with 239 and 231, respectively. Verlander finished second in a very close AL Cy Young Award race for 2012, collecting 149 points (12 first-place votes) to 153 points (13 first-place votes) for Tampa Bay Rays starter David Price.
On October 13, during Game 1 of the ALCS, Delmon Young hit his sixth career post-season home run, setting a new franchise record. Young later won the ALCS MVP Award.
Outfielder Austin Jackson won the Wilson Defensive Player of the Year Award.

All-Stars
The Tigers sent three players to the All-Star Game: pitcher Justin Verlander (fifth appearance), third baseman Miguel Cabrera (seventh appearance, third with the Tigers), and first baseman Prince Fielder (fourth appearance, first with the Tigers).  Fielder was voted in as a starter, and won the Home Run Derby with 28 home runs, the second time in his career and his first with the Tigers. Fielder also won a Silver Slugger Award.

Standings

2012 American League Central

2012 American League Playoff Teams

Game log

Regular season

|- bgcolor="#bbffbb"
| 1 || April 5 || Red Sox || W 3–2  || Valverde (1–0) || Melancon (0–1) ||  || 45,027 || 1–0
|-  bgcolor="#bbffbb"
| 2 || April 7 || Red Sox || W 10–0 || Below (1–0)|| Beckett (0–1)  ||  || 44,710 || 2–0
|- bgcolor="#bbffbb"
| 3 || April 8 || Red Sox || W 13–12 (11) || Below (2–0) || Melancon (0–2)  ||  || 30,788  || 3–0
|- bgcolor="#bbffbb"
| 4 || April 10 || Rays || W 5–2  || Coke (1–0) || McGee (0–1) || Valverde (1) || 22,574  || 4–0
|- bgcolor="#ffbbbb"
| 5 || April 11 || Rays || L 4–2  || Shields (1–0) || Verlander (0–1)  || Rodney (3)  || 28,180 || 4–1
|- bgcolor="#bbffbb"
| 6 || April 12 || Rays || W 7–2 || Balester (1–0) || Niemann (0–1) ||  || 30,288 || 5–1
|- bgcolor="#ffbbbb"
| 7 || April 13 || @ White Sox || L 5–2 || Peavy (1–0) || Scherzer (0–1) || Santiago (3) || 38,676 || 5–2
|- bgcolor="#ffbbbb"
| 8 || April 14 || @ White Sox || L 5–1 || Floyd (1–1) || Wilk (0–1) || || 33,025 || 5–3   
|- bgcolor="#bbffbb"
| 9 || April 15 || @ White Sox || W 5–2 || Porcello (1–0)  || Sale (1–1) ||   || 25,143 || 6–3
|- bgcolor="#bbffbb"
| 10 || April 16 || @ Royals || W 3–2 || Verlander (1–1) || Duffy (1–1) ||  || 14,039 || 7–3 
|- bgcolor="bbffbb"
| 11 || April 17 || @ Royals || W 3–1 ||Dotel (1–0) || Chen (0–1)  || Valverde (2) || 13,851 || 8–3
|- bgcolor="bbffbb"
| 12 || April 18 || @ Royals || W 4–3 || Scherzer (1–1) || Mijares (0–1)  || Valverde (3)  || 14,083 || 9–3 
|- bgcolor="#ffbbbb"
| 13 || April 19 || Rangers || L 10–3 || Darvish (2–0) || Wilk (0–2) ||  ||30,029 || 9–4 
|- bgcolor="#bbbbbb"
| – || April 20 || Rangers ||colspan=6| Postponed (rain). Rescheduled for April 21.
|- bgcolor="#ffbbbb"
| 14 || April 21 || Rangers || L 10–4 || Harrison (3–0) || Porcello (1–1) ||  || 41,427 || 9–5
|- bgcolor="#bbffbb"
| 15 || April 21 || Rangers || W 3–2 || Verlander (2–1)  || Feliz (1–1)  || Valverde (4) || 35,001 || 10–5
|- bgcolor="#ffbbbb"
| 16 || April 22 || Rangers || L 3–2 (11) || Ross (3–0) || Weber (0–1) || Nathan (4) || 36,255 || 10–6   
|- bgcolor="#ffbbbb"
| 17 || April 24 || Mariners || L 7–4 || Vargas (3–1) || Scherzer (1–2) || League (6) || 30,073 || 10–7
|- bgcolor="#ffbbbb"
| 18 || April 25 || Mariners || L 9–1 || Hernández (2–1) || Wilk (0–3) ||  || 28,527 || 10–8
|- bgcolor="#ffbbbb"
| 19 || April 26 || Mariners || L 5–4 || Furbush (1–1) || Porcello (1–2) || League (7) || 31,451 || 10–9  
|- bgcolor="#ffbbbb"
| 20 || April 27 || @ Yankees || L 7–6 || Rivera (1–1) || Villarreal (0–1) ||  || 41,200 || 10–10 
|- bgcolor="#bbffbb"
| 21 || April 28 || @ Yankees || W 7–5 || Smyly (1–0) || García (0–2) ||  || 44,686 || 11–10
|- bgcolor="#ffbbbb"
| 22 || April 29 || @ Yankees || L 2–6 || Sabathia (3–0) || Scherzer (1–3) ||  || 43,084 || 11–11 
|- bgcolor="#bbbbbb"
| – || April 30 || Royals ||colspan=6| Postponed (rain). Rescheduled for September 24. 
|-

|- bgcolor="bbffbb"
| 23 || May 1 || Royals || W 9–3 || Porcello (2–2) || Hochevar (2–2) || || 30,159 || 12–11
|- bgcolor="#ffbbbb"
| 24 || May 2 || Royals || L 3–2 || Collins (1–0) || Benoit (0–1) || Broxton (4) || 33,187 || 12–12 
|- bgcolor="bbffbb"
| 25 || May 4 || White Sox || W 5–4 || Valverde (2–0) || Thornton (1–1) || || 33,165 || 13–12
|- bgcolor="#ffbbbb"
| 26 || May 5 || White Sox || L 3–2 || Jones (1–0) || Valverde (2–1) || Reed (1) || 42,404 || 13–13  
|- bgcolor="bbffbb"
| 27 || May 6 || White Sox || W 3–1 || Porcello (3–2) || Axelrod (0–1) || Valverde (5) || 39,558 || 14–13  
|- bgcolor="#ffbbbb"
| 28 || May 7 || @ Mariners || L 3–2 || Delabar (1–0) || Dotel (1–1) || ||  14,462 || 14–14
|- bgcolor="#bbffbb"
| 29 || May 8 || @ Mariners || W 6–4 || Verlander (3–1) || Millwood (0–4) || Valverde (6) || 13,455 || 15–14 
|- bgcolor="#ffbbbb"
| 30 || May 9 || @ Mariners || L 2–1 || Vargas (4–2) || Putkonen (0–1) || League (8) || 15,655 || 15–15
|- bgcolor="#bbffbb"
| 31 || May 10 || @ Athletics || W 10–6 || Scherzer (2–3) || Colón (3–3) || || 11,513 || 16–15 
|- bgcolor="#ffbbbb"
| 32 || May 11 || @ Athletics || L 11–4 || Milone (5–2) || Porcello (3–3) || || 26,721 || 16–16
|- bgcolor="#ffbbbb"
| 33 || May 12 || @ Athletics || L 3–1 || McCarthy (3–3) || Fister (0–1) || Fuentes (2) || 22,077 || 16–17 
|- bgcolor="#bbffbb"
| 34 || May 13 || @ Athletics || W 3–1 || Verlander (4–1) || Parker (1–1) || Valverde (7) || 17,147 || 17–17 
|- bgcolor="#ffbbbb"
| 35 || May 14 || @ White Sox || L 7–5 || Stewart (1–1) || Putkonen (0–2) || Reed (3) || 25,538 || 17–18
|- bgcolor="#bbffbb"
| 36 || May 15 || @ White Sox || W 10–8 || Balester (2–0) || Ohman (0–2) || Dotel (1) || 21,473 || 18–18
|- bgcolor="#ffbbbb"
| 37 || May 16 || Twins || L 11–7 || Burnett (1–0) || Below (2–1) || || 33,955 || 18–19
|- bgcolor="#ffbbbb"
| 38 || May 17 || Twins || L 4–3 || Walters (1–1) || Fister (0–2) || Capps (8) || 37,840 || 18–20 
|- bgcolor="#bbffbb"
| 39 || May 18 || Pirates || W 6–0 || Verlander (5–1) || Morton (2–4) || || 41,661 || 19–20 
|- bgcolor="#ffbbbb"
| 40 || May 19 || Pirates || L 4–3 || Burnett (2–2) || Smyly (1–1) || Hanrahan (9) || 42,953 || 19–21
|- bgcolor="#bbffbb"
| 41 || May 20 || Pirates || W 4–3 || Scherzer (3–3) || Correia (1–5) || Benoit (1) || 39,971 || 20–21
|- bgcolor="#ffbbbb"
| 42 || May 22 || @ Indians || L 5–3 || Jiménez (5–3) || Porcello (3–4) || Perez (14) || 15,049 || 20–22
|- bgcolor="#ffbbbb"
| 43 || May 23 || @ Indians || L 4–2 || Pestano (2–0) || Coke (1–1) || Perez (15) || 22,000 || 20–23
|- bgcolor="#ffbbbb"
| 44 || May 24 || @ Indians || L 2–1 || Masterson (2–3) || Verlander (5–2) || Perez (16) || 23,622 || 20–24
|- bgcolor="#bbffbb"
| 45 || May 25 || @ Twins || W 10–6 || Smyly (2–1) || Swarzak (0–4) || || 37,688 || 21–24
|- bgcolor="#bbffbb"
| 46 || May 26 || @ Twins || W 6–3 || Scherzer (4–3) || Pavano (2–4) || Valverde (8) || 37,360 || 22–24 
|- bgcolor="#bbffbb"
| 47 || May 27 || @ Twins || W 4–3 || Villarreal (1–1) || Capps (0–3) || Valverde (9) || 38,710 || 23–24  
|- bgcolor="#ffbbbb"
| 48 || May 28 || @ Red Sox || L 7–4 || Doubront (5–2) ||Fister (0–3) || || 37,921 || 23–25
|- bgcolor="#ffbbbb"
| 49 || May 29 || @ Red Sox || L 6–3 || Bard (5–5) || Verlander (5–3) || Aceves (12) || 37,216 || 23–26
|- bgcolor="#ffbbbb"
| 50 || May 30 || @ Red Sox || L 6–4 || Albers (1–0) || Dotel (1–2) || Aceves (13) || 37,195 || 23–27
|- bgcolor="#bbffbb"
| 51 || May 31 || @ Red Sox || W 7–3 || Scherzer (5–3) || Beckett (4–5) || || 37,629 || 24–27 
|-

|- bgcolor="#ffbbbb"
| 52 || June 1 || Yankees || L 9–4 || Sabathia (7–2) || Crosby (0–1) || Soriano (7) || 41,831 || 24–28
|- bgcolor="#bbffbb"
| 53 || June 2 || Yankees || W 4–3 || Valverde (3–1) || Phelps (1–2) || || 44,593 || 25–28  
|- bgcolor="#ffbbbb"
| 54 || June 3 || Yankees || L 5–1 || Hughes (5–5)  || Verlander (5–4) || || 42,419 || 25–29
|- bgcolor="#ffbbbb"
| 55 || June 5 || Indians || L 4–2 || Jiménez (6–4) || Smyly (2–2) || Perez (18) || 33,258 || 25–30
|- bgcolor="#ffbbbb"
| 56 || June 6 || Indians || L 9–6 || Gómez (4–4) || Scherzer (5–4) || Perez (19) || 31,350 || 25–31 
|- bgcolor="#bbffbb"
| 57 || June 7 || Indians || W 7–5 || Crosby (1–1) || Lowe (7–4)  || Valverde (10) || 40,851 || 26–31
|- bgcolor="#ffbbbb"
| 58 || June 8 || @ Reds || L 6–5 (10) || LeCure (2–1) || Coke (1–2) || || 38,563 || 26–32
|- bgcolor="#bbffbb"
| 59 || June 9 || @ Reds || W 3–2 || Villarreal (2–1) || Marshall (1–3) || Valverde (11) || 42,443 || 27–32
|- bgcolor="#bbffbb"
| 60 || June 10 || @ Reds || W 7–6 || Villarreal (3–1) || Chapman (4–2) || Valverde (12) || 34,056 || 28–32
|- bgcolor="#ffbbbb"
| 61 || June 12 || @ Cubs || L 4–3 || Mármol (1–2) || Coke (1–3) || Camp (1) || 41,164 || 28–33
|- bgcolor="#bbffbb"
| 62 || June 13 || @ Cubs || W 8–4 || Porcello (4–4) || Garza (2–5) || || 41,326 || 29–33
|- bgcolor="#bbffbb"
| 63 || June 14 || @ Cubs || W 5–3 || Verlander (6–4) || Wood (0–3) || Valverde (13) || 42,292 || 30–33
|- bgcolor="#ffbbbb"
| 64 || June 15 || Rockies || L 12–4 (10) || Belisle (3–2) || Valverde (3–2) || || 41,878 || 30–34
|- bgcolor="#bbffbb"
| 65 || June 16 || Rockies || W 4–1 || Fister (1–3) || Friedrich (4–3) || || 41,800 || 31–34 
|- bgcolor="#bbffbb"
| 66 || June 17 || Rockies || W 5–0 || Scherzer (6–4) || Guthrie (3–6) || || 40,619 || 32–34
|- bgcolor="#bbffbb"
| 67 || June 19 || Cardinals || W 6–3 || Verlander (7–4) || Lynn (10–3) || Coke (1) || 36,733 || 33–34
|- bgcolor="#ffbbbb"
| 68 || June 20 || Cardinals || L 3–1 || Westbrook (6–6) || Porcello (4–5) || || 38,871 || 33–35  
|- bgcolor="#bbffbb"
| 69 || June 21 || Cardinals || W 2–1 (10) || Benoit (1–1) || Marté (0–1) || || 40,776 || 34–35
|- bgcolor="#ffbbbb"
| 70 || June 22 || @ Pirates || L 4–1 || Burnett (8–2) || Fister (1–4) || Hanrahan (18) || 37,965 || 34–36
|- bgcolor="#ffbbbb"
| 71 || June 23 || @ Pirates || L 4–1 || Lincoln (4–2) || Scherzer (6–5) || Hanrahan (19) || 38,734 || 34–37
|- bgcolor="#bbffbb"
| 72 || June 24 || @ Pirates || W 3–2 || Verlander (8–4) || Resop (0–3) || || 35,179 || 35–37
|- bgcolor="#bbffbb"
| 73 || June 25 || @ Rangers || W 8–2 || Porcello (5–5) || Grimm (1–1) || || 36,920 || 36–37
|- bgcolor="#ffbbbb"
| 74 || June 26 || @ Rangers || L 7–5 || Darvish (10–4) || Smyly (2–3) || Nathan (17) || 39,561 || 36–38
|- bgcolor="#ffbbbb"
| 75 || June 27 || @ Rangers || L 13–9 || Oswalt (2–0) || Fister (1–5) || || 43,379 || 36–39 
|- bgcolor="#bbffbb"
| 76 || June 28 || @ Rays || W 5–2 || Scherzer (7–5) || Shields (7–5) || Valverde (14) || 20,532 || 37–39
|- bgcolor="#ffbbbb"
| 77 || June 29 || @ Rays || L 4–2 || Price (11–4) || Verlander (8–5) || Rodney (22) || 19,557 || 37–40
|- bgcolor="#bbffbb"
| 78 || June 30 || @ Rays || W 6–2 || Porcello (6–5) || Hellickson (4–4) || || 29,443 || 38–40 
|- bgcolor="

|- bgcolor="#bbffbb"
| 79 || July 1 || @ Rays || W 5–3 || Smyly (3–3) || Cobb (3–5)  || Valverde (15) || 21,874 || 39–40 
|- bgcolor="#ffbbbb"
| 80 || July 2 || Twins || L 6–4 || Swarzak (2–4) || Fister (1–6) || Perkins (3) || 37,406 || 39–41
|- bgcolor="#ffbbbb"
| 81 || July 3 || Twins || L 8–6 || Gray (5–0) || Villarreal (3–2) || Perkins (4) || 36,757 || 39–42
|- bgcolor="#bbffbb"
| 82 || July 4 || Twins || W 5–1  || Verlander (9–5) || Duensing (1–5) || || 41,023 || 40–42
|- bgcolor="#bbffbb"
| 83 || July 5 || Twins || W 7–3  || Dotel (2–2) || Burnett (2–1) || || 33,350 || 41–42
|- bgcolor="#bbffbb"
| 84 || July 6 || Royals || W 4–2 || Smyly (4–3) || Sánchez (1–5) || Valverde (16) || 39,144 || 42–42
|- bgcolor="#bbffbb"
| 85 || July 7 || Royals || W 8–7 || Fister (2–6) || Chen (7–8) || || 39,392 || 43–42
|- bgcolor="#bbffbb"
| 86 || July 8 || Royals || W 7–1 || Scherzer (8–5) || Teaford (1–2) || || 36,693 || 44–42
|- bgcolor="#bbffbb"
| 87 || July 13 || @ Orioles || W 7–2 || Fister (3–6) || Hammel (8–6) || || 35,566 || 45–42
|- bgcolor="#ffbbbb"
| 88 || July 14 || @ Orioles || L 8–6 (13) || Gregg (3–2) || Benoit (1–2) || || 43,125 || 45–43
|- bgcolor="#bbffbb"
| 89 || July 15 || @ Orioles || W 4–0 || Verlander (10–5) || González (1–1) || || 30,439 || 46–43
|- bgcolor="#bbffbb"
| 90 || July 16 || Angels || W 8–6 || Dotel (3–2) || Hawkins (2–2) || Valverde (17) || 36,806 || 47–43
|- bgcolor="#ffbbbb"
| 91 || July 17 || Angels || L 13–0 || Richards (3–1) || Turner (0–1) || || 33,950 || 47–44
|- bgcolor="#bbffbb"
| 92 || July 18 || Angels || W 7–2 || Fister (4–6) || Wilson (9–6) || || 37,915 || 48–44
|- bgcolor="#bbffbb"
| 93 || July 19 || Angels || W 5–1 || Scherzer (9–5) || Williams (6–7) || || 40,311 || 49–44
|- bgcolor="#bbffbb"
| 94 || July 20 || White Sox || W 4–2 || Verlander (11–5) || Peavy (7–7) || Valverde (18) || 44,572 || 50–44   
|- bgcolor="#bbffbb"
| 95 || July 21 || White Sox || W 7–1 || Porcello (7–5) || Sale (11–3) || || 42,888 || 51–44
|- bgcolor="#bbffbb"
| 96 || July 22 || White Sox || W 6–4 || Turner (1–1) || Humber (4–5) || Benoit (2) || 41,281 || 52–44 
|- bgcolor="#ffbbbb"
| 97 || July 24 || @ Indians || L 3–2 || Smith (6–2) || Fister (4–7) || Perez (28) || 23,637 || 52–45
|- bgcolor="#bbffbb"
| 98 || July 25 || @ Indians || W 5–3 || Scherzer (10–5) || Lowe (8–9) || Valverde (19) || 24,029 || 53–45
|- bgcolor="#ffbbbb"
| 99 || July 26 || @ Indians || L 5–3 || Smith (7–2) || Verlander (11–6) || Perez (29) || 34,579 || 53–46
|- bgcolor="#ffbbbb"
| 100 || July 27 || @ Blue Jays || L 8–3 || Villanueva (6–0) || Porcello (7–6) || || 33,962 || 53–47 
|- bgcolor="#ffbbbb"
| 101 || July 28 || @ Blue Jays || L 5–1 || Álvarez (7–7) || Sánchez (5–8) || || 41,832 || 53–48
|- bgcolor="#bbffbb"
| 102 || July 29 || @ Blue Jays || W 4–1 || Fister (5–7) || Cecil (2–4) || Valverde (20) || 35,975 || 54–48
|- bgcolor="#ffbbbb"
| 103 || July 30 || @ Red Sox || L 7–3 || Buchholz (9–3) || Scherzer (10–6) || || 37,784 || 54–49 
|- bgcolor="#ffbbbb"
| 104 || July 31 || @ Red Sox || L 4–1 (6) || Mortensen (1–0)  || Verlander (11–7) || Morales (1) || 37,275 || 54–50
|-

|- bgcolor="#bbffbb"
| 105 || August 1 || @ Red Sox || W 7–5 || Porcello (8–6) || Cook (2–5) || Valverde (21) || 37,213 || 55–50
|- bgcolor="#bbffbb"
| 106 || August 3 || Indians || W 10–2 || Sánchez (6–8) || Masterson (7–10) || || 41,501 || 56–50
|- bgcolor="#bbffbb"
| 107 || August 4 || Indians || W 6–1 || Fister (6–7) || Jiménez (8–11) || || 42,744 || 57–50 
|- bgcolor="#bbffbb"
| 108 || August 5 || Indians || W 10–8 (10) || Downs (1–0) || Perez (0–3) || || 38,007 || 58–50
|- bgcolor="#bbffbb"
| 109 || August 6 || Yankees || W 7–2 || Verlander (12–7) || Nova (10–6) || || 41,381 || 59–50 
|- bgcolor="#bbffbb"
| 110 || August 7 || Yankees || W 6–5 || Porcello (9–6) || Hughes (11–9) || Valverde (22) || 39,760 || 60–50
|- bgcolor="#ffbbbb"
| 111 || August 8 || Yankees || L 12–8 || Sabathia (12–3) || Sánchez (6–9) || || 41,879 || 60–51
|- bgcolor="#ffbbbb"
| 112 || August 9 || Yankees || L 4–3 || Rapada (3–0) || Benoit (1–3) || Soriano (27) || 40,940 || 60–52
|- bgcolor="#bbffbb" 
| 113 || August 10 || @ Rangers || W 6–2 || Scherzer (11–6) || Feldman (6–7) || || 47,255 || 61–52
|- bgcolor="#ffbbbb" 
| 114 || August 11 || @ Rangers || L 2–1 || Adams (2–3) || Villarreal (3–3) || || 48,303 || 61–53
|- bgcolor="#ffbbbb"  
| 115 || August 12 || @ Rangers || L 8–3 || Darvish (12–8) || Porcello (9–7) || || 45,752 || 61–54
|- bgcolor="#ffbbbb"  
| 116 || August 13 || @ Twins || L 9–3 || Deduno (4–0) || Sánchez (6–10) || || 34,366 || 61–55
|- bgcolor="#bbffbb"  
| 117 || August 14 || @ Twins || W 8–4 || Fister (7–7) || Duensing (2–8) || || 37,544 || 62–55 
|- bgcolor="#bbffbb"   
| 118 || August 15 || @ Twins || W 5–1 || Scherzer (12–6) || De Vries (2–4) || || 37,118 || 63–55 
|- bgcolor="#bbffbb" 
| 119 || August 17 || Orioles || W 5–3 || Benoit (2–3) || O'Day (6–1) || Valverde (23) || 41,620 || 64–55
|- bgcolor="#ffbbbb" 
| 120 || August 18 || Orioles || L 3–2 || Britton (2–1) || Porcello (9–8) || Johnson (36) || 42,132 || 64–56
|- bgcolor="#ffbbbb" 
| 121 || August 19 || Orioles || L 7–5 || Chen (12–7) || Fister (7–8) || Johnson (37) || 40,511 || 64–57
|- bgcolor="#bbffbb" 
| 122 || August 21 || Blue Jays || W 5–3 || Scherzer (13–6) || Romero (8–11) || Valverde (24) || 39,499 || 65–57
|- bgcolor="#bbffbb" 
| 123 || August 22 || Blue Jays || W 3–2 || Sánchez (7–10) || Laffey (3–5) || Valverde (25) || 37,225 || 66–57
|- bgcolor="#bbffbb" 
| 124 || August 23 || Blue Jays || W 3–2 (11) || Benoit (3–3)  || Jenkins (0–1) || || 39,910 || 67–57
|- bgcolor="#ffbbbb" 
| 125 || August 24 || Angels || L 2–1 || Greinke (11–5) || Porcello (9–9) || Richards (1) || 39,356 || 67–58 
|- bgcolor="#bbffbb" 
| 126 || August 25 || Angels || W 5–3 || Dotel (4–2) || Richards (3–3) || Valverde (26) || 41,970 || 68–58
|- bgcolor="#bbffbb" 
| 127 || August 26 || Angels || W 5–2 || Scherzer (14–6) || Santana (7–11) || || 40,074 || 69–58 
|- bgcolor="#ffbbbb" 
| 128 || August 28 || @ Royals || L 9–8 || Crow (3–1) || Villarreal (3–4) || Holland (8) || 13,601 || 69–59
|- bgcolor="#ffbbbb" 
| 129 || August 29 || @ Royals || L 1–0 || Chen (10–10) || Sánchez (7–11) || Holland (9) || 13,024 || 69–60
|- bgcolor="#ffbbbb" 
| 130 || August 30 || @ Royals || L 2–1 || Guthrie (6–12) || Porcello (9–10) || Herrera (1) || 12,997 || 69–61
|- bgcolor="#bbffbb" 
| 131 || August 31 || White Sox || W 7–4 || Dotel (5–2) || Peavy (9–10) || Valverde (27) || 36,721 || 70–61
|-

|- bgcolor="#bbffbb" 
| 132 || September 1 || White Sox || W 5–1 || Scherzer (15–6) || Liriano (5–11) || || 40,059 || 71–61
|- bgcolor="#bbffbb" 
| 133 || September 2 || White Sox || W 4–2 || Verlander (13–7) || Sale (15–6) || Valverde (28) || 42,192 || 72–61 
|- bgcolor="#ffbbbb" 
| 134 || September 3 || Indians || L 3–2 || Kluber (1–3) || Downs (1–1) || Pestano (2) || 35,418 || 72–62
|- bgcolor="#ffbbbb"
| 135 || September 4 || Indians || L 3–2 || Masterson (11–12) || Porcello (9–11) || Perez (34) || 27,729 || 72–63
|- bgcolor="#bbffbb" 
| 136 || September 5 || Indians || W 7–1 || Fister (8–8) || Jiménez (9–15) || || 28,881 || 73–63 
|- bgcolor="#ffbbbb"
| 137 || September 7 || @ Angels || L 3–2 || Frieri (4–0) || Dotel (5–3) || || 40,104 || 73–64 
|- bgcolor="#ffbbbb"
| 138 || September 8 || @ Angels || L 6–1 || Wilson (12–9) || Verlander (13–8) || || 41,154 || 73–65 
|- bgcolor="#ffbbbb"
| 139 || September 9 || @ Angels || L 3–2 || Greinke (14–5) || Sánchez (7–12) || Frieri (18) || 38,216 || 73–66
|- bgcolor="#ffbbbb"
| 140 || September 10  || @ White Sox || L 6–1 || Quintana (6–4) || Porcello (9–12) || || 30,287 || 73–67 
|- bgcolor="#bbffbb" 
| 141 || September 11 || @ White Sox || W 5–3 || Fister (9–8) || Peavy (10–11) || Valverde (29) || 26,504 || 74–67
|- bgcolor="#bbffbb" 
| 142 || September 12 || @ White Sox || W 8–6 || Scherzer (16–6) || Floyd (9–10) || Valverde (30) || 30,667 || 75–67
|- bgcolor="#bbbbbb"
| – || September 13 || @ White Sox ||  colspan=6| Postponed (rain). Rescheduled for September 17. 
|- bgcolor="#bbffbb" 
| 143 || September 14 || @ Indians || W 4–0 || Verlander (14–8) || Kluber (1–4) || || 17,185 || 76–67 
|- bgcolor="#bbffbb" 
| 144 || September 15 || @ Indians || W 5–3 || Sánchez (8–12) || Masterson (11–14) || Valverde (31) || 22,849 || 77–67 
|- bgcolor="#ffbbbb"
| 145 || September 16 || @ Indians || L 7–6 || Rogers (2–3) || Valverde (3–3) || || 17,233 || 77–68 
|- bgcolor="#ffbbbb"
| 146 || September 17 ||  @ White Sox || L 5–4  || Jones (8–0) || Fister (9–9) || Reed (27) || 29,130 || 77–69
|- bgcolor="#bbffbb" 
| 147 || September 18 || Athletics || W 12–2 || Downs (2–1) || Griffin (6–1) || || 31,243 || 78–69
|- bgcolor="#bbffbb" 
| 148 || September 19 || Athletics || W 6–2 || Verlander (15–8) || Anderson (4–2) || || 29,734 || 79–69 
|- bgcolor="#ffbbbb"
| 149 || September 20 || Athletics || L 12–4 || Neshek (2–1) || Sánchez (8–13) || || 34,635 || 79–70 
|- bgcolor="#bbbbbb"
| – || September 21 || Twins ||colspan=6| Postponed (rain). Rescheduled for September 23.
|- bgcolor="#bbffbb" 
| 150 || September 22 || Twins || W 8–0 || Fister (10–9) || Deduno (6–5) || || 40,586 || 80–70 
|- bgcolor="#ffbbbb"
| 151 || September 23 || Twins || L 10–4 || Diamond (12–8) || Scherzer (16–7) || || 40,438 || 80–71
|- bgcolor="#ffbbbb"
| 152 || September 23 || Twins || L 2–1 (10) || Burton (2–1) || Valverde (3–4) || Perkins (14) || 39,839 || 80–72
|- bgcolor="#bbffbb" 
|| 153 || September 24 || Royals || W 6–2 || Verlander (16–8)  || Hochevar (8–15) || || 31,521 || 81–72
|- bgcolor="#bbffbb" 
| 154 || September 25 || Royals || W 2–0 || Sánchez (9–13) || Chen (11–13) || || 29,048 || 82–72
|- bgcolor="#bbffbb" 
| 155 || September 26 || Royals || W 5–4 || Benoit (4–3) || Herrera (4–3) || Valverde (32) || 32,360 || 83–72
|- bgcolor="#bbffbb" 
| 156 || September 27 || Royals || W 5–4 || Benoit (5–3) || Collins (5–4) || || 33,019 || 84–72 
|- bgcolor="#ffbbbb"
| 157 || September 28 || @ Twins || L 4–2 || Burton (3–1) || Villarreal (3–5) || Perkins (16) || 30,315 || 84–73
|- bgcolor="#bbffbb" 
| 158 || September 29 || @ Twins || W 6–4 || Verlander (17–8) || Walters (2–5) || Valverde (33) || 32,839 || 85–73
|- bgcolor="#bbffbb" 
| 159 || September 30 || @ Twins || W 2–1 || Coke (2–3) || Burton (3–2) || Valverde (34) || 32,554 || 86–73
|-

|- bgcolor="#bbffbb" 
| 160 || October 1 || @ Royals || W 6–3 || Porcello (10–12) || Chen (11–14) || Valverde (35) || 15,312 || 87–73
|- bgcolor="#ffbbbb"
| 161 || October 2 || @ Royals || L 4–2 || Guthrie (8–12) || Fister (10–10) || Holland (16) || 14,283 || 87–74 
|- bgcolor="#bbffbb" 
| 162 || October 3 || @ Royals || W 1–0 || Marte (1–0) || Mendoza (8–10) || Putkonen (1) || 30,383 || 88–74
|-

Postseason

American League Division Series

|- bgcolor="#bbffbb"
| 1 || October 6  || Athletics || W 3–1 || Verlander (1–0)  || Parker (0–1) || Valverde (1) || 43,323 || 1–0
|- bgcolor="#bbffbb"
| 2 || October 7  || Athletics || W 5–4 ||  Alburquerque (1–0) || Balfour (0–1) || || 40,684 || 2–0
|- bgcolor="#ffbbbb"
| 3 || October 9  || @ Athletics || L 2–0 || Anderson (1–0)  || Sánchez (0–1) || Balfour (1) || 37,090 || 2–1
|- bgcolor="ffbbbb"
| 4 || October 10  || @ Athletics || L 4–3 || Cook (1–0)  || Valverde (0–1) || || 36,385 || 2–2
|- bgcolor="#bbffbb"
| 5 || October 11  || @ Athletics || W 6–0 || Verlander (2–0)  || Parker (0–2)  || || 36,393 || 3–2
|- bgcolor="

American League Championship Series

|- bgcolor="#bbffbb"
| 1 || October 13  || @ Yankees || W 6–4 (12) || Smyly (1–0)  || Phelps (0–1)  ||  || 47,122 || 1–0
|- bgcolor="#bbffbb"
| 2 || October 14  || @ Yankees  || W 3–0 ||  Sánchez (1–0) || Kuroda (0–1) || Coke (1) ||47,082  || 2–0
|- bgcolor="#bbffbb"
| 3 || October 16  ||  Yankees  || W 2–1 ||  Verlander (1–0) || Hughes (0–1) || Coke (2) || 42,970 || 3–0
|- bgcolor="#bbbbbb"
| – || October 17|| Yankees ||colspan=6| Postponed (rain). Rescheduled for October 18.
|- bgcolor="bbffbb"
| 4 || October 18  ||   Yankees  || W 8–1  || Scherzer (1–0)  || Sabathia (0–1) || || 42,477 || 4–0
|-

World Series

|- bgcolor="ffbbbb"
| 1 || October 24  || @  Giants|| L 8–3 || Zito (1–0) || Verlander (0–1)  ||  || 42,855 || 0–1
|- bgcolor="ffbbbb"
| 2 || October 25  || @  Giants||   L 2–0 || Bumgarner (1–0)  || Fister (0–1) || Romo (1)|| 42,982 || 0–2
|- bgcolor="ffbbbb"
| 3 || October 27  ||   Giants|| L 2–0 || Vogelsong (1–0) || Sánchez (0–1)  || Romo (2) || 42,262 || 0–3
|- bgcolor="ffbbbb"
| 4 || October 28  ||  Giants|| L 4–3 (10) || Casilla (1–0) ||  Coke (0–1) || Romo (3) ||42,152  || 0–4
|-

Record vs. opponents

Roster

(*) = Was on team for part of 2012 season.

Player stats

Batting
Note: G = Games played; AB = At bats; R = Runs scored; H = Hits; 2B = Doubles; 3B = Triples; HR = Home runs; RBI = Runs batted in; AVG = Batting average; SB = Stolen bases

Pitching

Starters
Note: W = Wins; L = Losses; ERA = Earned run average; G = Games pitched; GS = Games started; SV = Saves; IP = Innings pitched; R = Runs allowed; ER = Earned runs allowed; BB = Walks allowed; K = Strikeouts

Bullpen
Note: W = Wins; L = Losses; ERA = Earned run average; G = Games pitched; GS = Games started; SV = Saves; IP = Innings pitched; R = Runs allowed; ER = Earned runs allowed; BB = Walks allowed; K = Strikeouts

Farm system 

LEAGUE CHAMPIONS: Lakeland

References

External links

Detroit Tigers official site
2012 Detroit Tigers at Baseball Reference

Detroit Tigers seasons
Detroit Tigers season
American League Central champion seasons
American League champion seasons
2012 in sports in Michigan
2012 in Detroit